The Chicago and North Western Railway class D was a class of 92 American 4-4-2 "Atlantic" locomotives. They were built by Schenectady Locomotive Works and by its corporate successor the American Locomotive Company between 1900 and 1908. In addition, the Chicago, St. Paul, Minneapolis and Omaha Railway (Omaha Road) bought seven, classifying them as class G-3

Design
The locomotives had a boiler pressurized to  providing steam to two cylinders with a  bore and a  stroke. They were connected to  driving wheels by a variety of valve gear: most had Stephenson valve gear and  piston valves; No. 1026 was fitted up with Youngs rotary valves and valve gear in 1903, but later reverted to Stephensons valve gear. The 1908 batch had Walschaerts valve gear, the first five locomotives having piston valves and the last ten were delivered with Young rotary valves; these were replaced with piston valves when the locomotives were fitted with superheaters.

Construction
All 92 locomotives were built by Schenectady Locomotive Works and by the same works under its corporate successor, the American Locomotive Company.

Service
At the time of their introduction, wooden cars were the norm. The class D locomotives were quite capable of pulling a 10-car, 400-ton train on the 138-mile Chicago to Clinton route in 3 hours 25 minutes inclusive of eleven stops.

Unfortunately, steel cars came into use soon after, and the locomotives became outclassed. They were then downgraded to commuter service and locals.

On the Omaha Road, one of the later uses of their class G-3 was powering the Minneapolis to Ashland train The Namakagon substituting for the regular gas-electric car when it was in the shops or the load exceeded its two-car capacity. 

Retirements started in 1931, and continued until the end of steam in 1956 when the last two were retired from Chicago commuter service.

One locomotive has been preserved: CNW 1015, the first locomotive built. It is on display at the National Museum of Transportation at Kirkwood, Missouri.

References

Bibliography

See also

D
4-4-2 locomotives
Schenectady Locomotive Works locomotives
ALCO locomotives
Passenger locomotives
Railway locomotives introduced in 1900
Steam locomotives of the United States
Standard gauge locomotives of the United States